Blaž Rola was the defending champion, but did not participate.

Kimmer Coppejans won the title, defeating Roberto Marcora in the final, 7–6(8–6), 5–7, 6–1.

Seeds

Draw

Finals

Top half

Bottom half

References
 Main Draw
 Qualifying Draw

China International Guangzhou - Singles
China International Guangzhou